Poila (also known as Pwehla) was a Shan state in the Myelat region of what is today Burma. Its population was mostly Taungyo, with the remainder being Danu and Pa-O.

References

Shan States